Lankascincus merrill, also known commonly as Merrill's lanka skink, is a species of lizard in the family Scincidae. The species is endemic to Sri Lanka.

Etymology
The specific name, merrill, is in honor of Sri Lankan tea executive Merrill J. Fernando for his support of biodiversity conservation.

References

Lankascincus
Reptiles described in 2020
Reptiles of Sri Lanka
Taxa named by Mendis Wickramasinghe